James Michael Parks (21 October 1931 – 31 May 2022) was an English cricketer. He played in forty-six Tests for England, between 1954 and 1968. In those Tests, Parks scored 1,962 runs with a personal best of 108 not out, and took 103 catches and made 11 stumpings.

Early life
Parks was born in Haywards Heath on 21 October 1931.  His father, Jim Sr., was a prolific all-rounder for Sussex and played once for England in 1937, while his uncle, Harry, played over 400 games for Sussex.  Parks attended Hove County Grammar School for Boys.

Career
Parks was an attacking batsman, athletic fieldsman and a spin bowler who made his first-class debut for Sussex in 1949. By 1958, and with Sussex struggling for a reliable stopper, Parks made a successful switch to wicketkeeping.

Parks describes the unusual circumstances in which he first began keeping wicket:

It came about by accident. I didn't keep wicket at the start of my career. I was a specialist batsman. A couple of years after that, Sussex were playing against Essex in a Championship game at Chelmsford, when our wicketkeeper, Rupert Webb got injured. There we were in the Chelmsford dressing room before the start of play and we suddenly realised we've got no wicketkeeper. Robin Marlar, the Sussex captain, looked at me and said "You're doing it". I didn't have any kit and so had to borrow Essex keeper Brian Taylor's gloves.

Prior to that, in 1954, Parks had been picked, purely as a batsman, for one Test against Pakistan at the age of 22. He made little impact and had to wait until early in 1960 to score an unbeaten century, batting at number seven, to help England gain a draw and clinch the series whilst touring the West Indies. He then remained England's first choice wicket-keeper through to the mid-1960s. In the 1965–66 Ashes series he made 290 runs (48.33) and hit his fair share of boundaries, but a missed stumping off Peter Burge in the Second Test cost England a chance of regaining the urn.

The cricket writer Colin Bateman commented, "Parks was a gifted batsman and a most effective wicketkeeper". Bateman added "although he never suggested he was in the same class as Godfrey Evans before him or Alan Knott after, Parks had safe hands and was a good stopper".

Parks captained Sussex from 1967 to 1968, before he was succeeded by Mike Griffith. He left Sussex following the 1972 season, and joined Somerset on a three-year contract. He retired from first-class cricket in 1976. In 739 first-class matches, he scored 36,673 runs at an average of 34.76, with 51 hundreds and 213 fifties. He took 1,087 catches and made 92 stumpings. He also took 51 wickets, with a personal best of 3 for 23.

Later life
After retiring from cricket, Parks was employed by Whitbread.  He subsequently went back to Sussex to be its marketing manager and went on to serve two terms as club president starting in 2013.  He also acted as manager of the Old England cricket team for several years.  From August 2021 until his death, Parks was the oldest surviving male England Test cricketer.

Personal life and death
Parks was married to Jenny (née Rogers) from 1973 until his death. His previous marriages, to Irene Young and then Ann Wembridge, both ended in divorce. He had three children with Irene, Andrew (d. 2004), Bobby, who played county cricket for both Hampshire and Kent, and Louise.

Parks died on the morning of 31 May 2022 at Worthing Hospital.  He was 90, and suffered a fall at his home in the week prior to his death.

Citations

General and cited references

External links
 

1931 births
2022 deaths
A. E. R. Gilligan's XI cricketers
Accidental deaths from falls
Accidental deaths in England
Combined Services cricketers
England Test cricketers
English cricketers of 1946 to 1968
English cricketers
International Cavaliers cricketers
Marylebone Cricket Club cricketers
North v South cricketers
People educated at Hove Grammar School
People from Haywards Heath
Players cricketers
Sussex cricket captains
Sussex cricketers
T. N. Pearce's XI cricketers
Wicket-keepers
Wisden Cricketers of the Year
Somerset cricketers